The United States Virgin Islands competed at the 1988 Winter Olympics in Calgary, Alberta, Canada. The nation debuted at the Winter Olympic Games.

Competitors
The following is the list of number of competitors in the Games.

Alpine skiing

Women

Bobsleigh

Luge

Women

References

 Official Olympic Reports
 Olympic Winter Games 1988, full results by sports-reference.com

External links
 

Nations at the 1988 Winter Olympics
1988 Winter Olympics
1988 in the United States Virgin Islands
Win